Effector may refer to:

Effector (biology), a molecule that binds to a protein and thereby alters the activity of that protein
Effector (album), a music album by the Experimental Techno group Download
 EFFector, a publication of the Electronic Frontier Foundation

See also
Effexor, a brand name for the antidepressant venlafaxine
Bacterial effector protein, proteins secreted by bacterial pathogens into the cells of their host
Effector cell
End effector, the device at the end of a robotic arm
Affect (disambiguation)